Cherevkovo is the name of several rural localities in Russia:
Cherevkovo, Arkhangelsk Oblast, a selo in Cherevkovsky Selsoviet of Krasnoborsky District of Arkhangelsk Oblast
Cherevkovo, Pskov Oblast, a village in Dnovsky District of Pskov Oblast
Cherevkovo, Rostov Oblast, a settlement in Udarnikovskoye Rural Settlement of Krasnosulinsky District of Rostov Oblast